Greg Kihn is the debut studio album by American singer/songwriter Greg Kihn. It was released by Beserkley in 1976.

The cover photo portrays Kihn as a working-class man and was shot in front of Rather Ripped Records in Berkeley where he worked at the time, with future Greg Kihn Band keyboard player Gary Phillips.

Track listing

Personnel
Greg Kihn - 12-string guitar, vocals
Robbie Dunbar - guitar, keyboards, backing vocals
Larry Lynch - drums, percussion, backing vocals
Steve Wright - bass
Additional personnel
John Doukas - backing vocals, co-lead vocals on "He Will Break Your Heart"
Gary Phillips - guitar, backing vocals
Mark Jordan - keyboards
Production
Producer: Matthew King Kaufman, Glen Kolotkin
Engineers: Glen Kolotkin, Tom Lubin
Mastering: George Horn
Art direction: Ron Scherl, Tom Lubin
Artwork/Design: M. M. Givens 
Logistics: C. Lovett
Ron Scherl - cover photography

References

External links
http://www.discogs.com/Greg-Kihn-Greg-Kihn/release/1700243

1976 debut albums
Greg Kihn albums
Beserkley Records albums
Albums produced by Glen Kolotkin